Quinton Bernard Smith (born January 14, 1984) is a former American football running back. He was signed by the New England Patriots as an undrafted free agent in 2007. He played college football at Rice.

Smith was also a member of the New York Giants, New Orleans Saints, and Oakland Raiders.

Early years
Smith attended Cedar Park High School in Cedar Park, Texas. He finished his career with school records of 57 touchdowns, 4,445 rushing yards, and 4,975 yards of total offense.

External links
 New England Patriots bio

1984 births
Living people
American football running backs
Rice Owls football players
New England Patriots players
New York Giants players
New Orleans Saints players
Oakland Raiders players
Sportspeople from Tyler, Texas
Players of American football from Texas